Antônio Bento dos Santos (born 18 December 1971), known as just Bentinho, is a former Brazilian football player.

Club statistics

References

External links

jsgoal

1971 births
Living people
Brazilian footballers
Brazil youth international footballers
Brazilian expatriate footballers
Saudi Professional League players
J1 League players
J2 League players
São José Esporte Clube players
Associação Portuguesa de Desportos players
São Paulo FC players
Botafogo de Futebol e Regatas players
Cruzeiro Esporte Clube players
Club Athletico Paranaense players
Tokyo Verdy players
Al Hilal SFC players
Kashiwa Reysol players
Oita Trinita players
Kawasaki Frontale players
Avispa Fukuoka players
Expatriate footballers in Japan
Brazilian expatriate sportspeople in Saudi Arabia
Expatriate footballers in Saudi Arabia
Association football forwards